Socialist Group is a primarily social-democratic political grouping in the Parliamentary Assembly of the Council of Europe.

Socialist Group may also refer to:

 Socialist Group (NATO Parliamentary Assembly), consists of members of social democratic and democratic socialist parties from NATO member states
 Socialist Group (UK), short-lived Trotskyist group in Britain during the mid 1980s
 New Left group, French parliamentary group in the National Assembly consisting primarily of members of the Socialist Party (PS)
 Socialist and Republican group, French parliamentary group in the Senate consisting primarily of members of the PS
 Progressive Alliance of Socialists and Democrats, political group in the European Parliament